Aegomorphus modestus is a species of beetle in the family Cerambycidae. It was described by Gyllenhal in 1817.

References

Aegomorphus
Beetles described in 1817